Finkenberg is a municipality in the Schwaz district in the Austrian state of Tyrol.

Geography
Finkenberg lies about 3 km southwest of Mayrhofen at the entrance to the Tuxer valley.

Sightseeing 
 Garnet Chapel near the Penken.

References

Cities and towns in Schwaz District